The Ministry of Justice and Human Rights (MJyDH) of Argentina is a ministry of the national executive power tasked with enforcing of the law and administration of justice and upholding human rights.

The ministry was created in 1949, during the first presidency of Juan Domingo Perón, and has been consistently present in every presidential cabinet since then. The incumbent minister is Marcela Losardo, who has served since 10 December 2019 in the cabinet of Alberto Fernández.

Structure
The Ministry of Justice and Human Rights counts with a number of centralized dependencies reporting to it. The centralized dependencies, as in other government ministers, are known as secretariats (secretarías) and undersecretariats (subsecretarías); there are currently four of these:

Undersecretariat of Administrative Management (Subsecretaría de Gestión Administrativa)
Secretariat of Justice (Secretaría de Justicia)
Undersecretariat of Penitentiary Affairs (Subsecretaría de Asuntos Penitenciarios)
Undersecretariat of Criminal Policy (Subsecretaría de Política Criminal)
Undersecretariat of Access to Justice (Subsecretaría de Acceso a la Justicia)
Undersecretariat of Relations with the Judiciary and Academia (Subsecretaría de Relaciones con el Poder Judicial y la Comunidad Académica)
Secretariat of Human Rights (Secretaría de Derechos Humanos)
Undersecretariat of Protection and International Links on Human Rights (Subsecretaría de Protección y Enlace Internacional en Derechos Humanos)
Undersecretariat of the Promotion of Human Rights (Subsecretaría de Promoción de Derechos Humanos)
General Secretariat of Justice and Human Rights (Secretaría General de Justicia y Derechos Humanos)

In addition, the National Institute Against Discrimination, Xenophobia and Racism (INADI), the Office of the General Notary of the Government of the Nation, the Procuratorship of the Treasure of the Nation, the International Centre for the Promotion of Human Rights (CIPDH), the University Institute of the Mothers of Plaza de Mayo (IUNMA) and Argentina's federal prison system all depend on the Ministry of Justice.

List of ministers

See also
Justice ministry
Judiciary of Argentina

References

External links
  

Justice
Justice ministries
Ministers of Justice of Argentina
1949 establishments in Argentina